The 2021 V.League 2 (known as the LS V.League 2 for sponsorship reasons) was the 27th season of V.League 2, Vietnam's second tier professional football league.

The season was suspended on 6 May 2021 due to an outbreak of a new highly contagious variant of the coronavirus in the country. It was announced in August that the season would resume on 20 November 2021. However, all V.League clubs voted on 21 August to cancel the season. There will not be promotion/relegation since the season was abandoned.

Teams

Team changes

Withdrawn
 XM Fico Tay Ninh
 Gia Dinh (Replaced by Cong An Nhan Dan)

Stadia and locations

Note: Table lists in alphabetical order.

Number of teams by region

Personnel and kits

Managerial changes

First phase

Table

Positions by round

Results

Season progress

Season statistics

Top scorers

Clean sheets

References

External links
 Official Page

V.League 2
Vietnam
2021 in Vietnamese football
Vietnam